Benjamin van den Broek (born 21 September 1987) is a New Zealand international footballer who currently plays as a midfielder for Koninklijke HFC in the Dutch Tweede Divisie.

Born in Geleen, van den Broek has played for clubs in the Netherlands, England and Romania.

He represented New Zealand at international level.

Club career
He started his career with NAC Breda, but made no Eredivisie appearances for the club. In 2008, he moved to HFC Haarlem, where he made 57 appearances in the Eerste Divisie, scoring 10 goals.

After Haarlem went bust in January 2010, Van den Broek was left without a club. Despite attracting interest from Lierse SK of Belgium and FC Den Bosch, he signed for English League Two club Shrewsbury Town on 12 February until the end of the season. He made his debut on 6 March, replacing Jamie Cureton for the last 25 minutes of a 0–3 defeat at Grimsby Town. His first start came a week later in his first game at the New Meadow, lasting 73 minutes before being replaced by Steve Leslie in a 0–1 defeat to Rochdale. He scored his only goal for the club in a 2–3 home defeat against Morecambe on 1 May. Later that month, he signed a new one-year contract.

He signed a contract with Dutch club Den Bosch in spring 2011. On 2 February 2015, Van den Broek signed with Romanian Liga I side Universitatea Cluj.

In August 2015, Van den Broek signed for Conference side Barrow on a deal until the end of the season. However, in January 2016, Van den Broek left by mutual consent and went on to sign a two and a half-year contract at Dutch side Telstar.

International career
On 8 March 2015, Van den Broek was called into the New Zealand national football team to play a friendly against South Korea by coach Anthony Hudson. He qualified through his mother, who is from New Zealand. He made his debut in the match in Seoul on 31 March, replacing Bill Tuiloma for the final ten minutes of a 0–1 defeat.

Career statistics

References

 Van den Broek maakt overstap naar SC Telstar, tjerkstramedia.nl, 7 January 2016

External links
 Voetbal International profile 
 
 

1987 births
Living people
People from Geleen
Association football midfielders
New Zealand association footballers
New Zealand international footballers
Dutch footballers
Dutch people of New Zealand descent
Dutch expatriate footballers
Eerste Divisie players
Tweede Divisie players
English Football League players
National League (English football) players
Liga I players
NAC Breda players
HFC Haarlem players
Shrewsbury Town F.C. players
Barrow A.F.C. players
FC Den Bosch players
FC Universitatea Cluj players
SC Telstar players
Expatriate footballers in England
Expatriate footballers in Romania
Dutch expatriate sportspeople in England
Dutch expatriate sportspeople in Romania
New Zealand expatriate sportspeople in England
New Zealand expatriate sportspeople in Romania
Koninklijke HFC players
Footballers from Limburg (Netherlands)